The 1935 New South Wales state election was held on 11 May 1935.

The result of the election was:
United Australia Party 38 seats
Country Party 23 seats
Australian Labor Party (NSW)  29 seats.

The UAP/Country Party coalition of Bertram Stevens/Michael Bruxner had a majority of 32 (down 10) and continued in government throughout the term.

Labor (NSW) and the Federal Executive of the Australian Labor Party were still divided at the 1935 election and Federal Labor ran candidates in 22 seats without success. The parties were re-united in 1936. Jack Lang remained party leader and Leader of the Opposition throughout the term of the parliament.

Key dates

Results

{{Australian elections/Title row
| table style = float:right;clear:right;margin-left:1em;
| title        = New South Wales state election, 11 May 1935
| house        = Legislative Assembly
| series       = New South Wales state election
| back         = 1932
| forward      = 1938
| enrolled     = 1,347,884
| total_votes  = 1,255,419
| turnout %    = 96.06
| turnout chg  = −0.34
| informal     = 39,333
| informal %   = 3.04
| informal chg = 0.83
}}

|}

Retiring members

Changing seats

See also 
 Candidates of the 1935 New South Wales state election
 Members of the New South Wales Legislative Assembly, 1935–1938

Notes

References

Bibliography

Elections in New South Wales
New South Wales
1930s in New South Wales
May 1935 events